International Language is the twelfth studio album by English electronic band Cabaret Voltaire, released in October 1993 on the band's own label, Plastex.

Content 

AllMusic wrote that the album "tones down the Chicago house elements which had creeped into [Cabaret Voltaire's previous album] Plasticity, replacing them with sublime acid-electro, tribal elements on several tracks".

Release 

International Language was released on 8 October 1993 on the band's own label, Plastex.

Reception 

AllMusic wrote that, while "the melodies and chord progressions sometimes verge on the obvious", and "the same emphasis on samples [...] occasionally distorts the value of the underlying music", the album is "a worthy addition to CV's mammoth discography".

Track listing

All tracks composed by Richard H. Kirk and Stephen Mallinder.

 "Everything Is True" - 10:50
 "Radical Chic" - 6:50
 "Taxi Mutant" - 10:06
 "Let It Come Down" - 9:27
 "Afterglow" - 8:00
 "The Root" - 9:17
 "Millenium" - 6:22
 "Belly of the Beast (Back in Babylon)" - 8:15
 "Other World" - 5:37

References

External links 

 

Cabaret Voltaire (band) albums
1993 albums